A nurse anesthetist is an advanced practice nurse who administers anesthesia for surgery or other medical procedures. They are involved in the administration of anesthesia in a majority of countries, with varying levels of autonomy.

A survey published in 1996 reported that there were 107 countries where nurses administer anesthesia in some form, and a further nine countries where nurses act as assistants in the administration of anesthesia. Depending on the country or locality, their role may be limited to intraoperative care during anesthesia itself or may also extend before and after (for preanesthetic assessment and immediate postoperative management). The United States is one of the only countries in which nurses provide anesthesia without supervision from a medical doctor trained in anesthesia, also known as an anesthesiologists. Even within the United States, the practice is banned in many states.

The International Federation of Nurse Anesthetists was established in 1989 as a forum for developing standards of education, practice, and a code of ethics.

United States 

In the United States, nurse anesthetists have the protected title of Certified Registered Nurse Anesthetist (CRNA); they account for approximately half of the anesthesia providers in the United States and are the main providers of anesthesia in rural America.

Nurses have been providing anesthesia care to patients since the American Civil War. Nurse anesthetists are considered an essential role to the health care workforce. They provide pain management and emergency services to the airway management, which was very important to patients in the Civil War.

The National Association of Nurse Anesthetists professional association was established by Agatha Hodgkins in 1931. Depending on the local system of healthcare, they participate only during the operation itself or may also be involved before and after (for preanesthetic assessment and immediate postoperative management). It was renamed the American Association of Nurse Anesthetists in 1939. The group established educational institutions for nurse anesthetists in 1952 and established the CRNA certification in 1957. AANA continuing education was established in 1977. As of 2011, some 92% of CRNAs in the U.S. were represented by the AANA.

Scope of practice rules vary between healthcare facility and state. Before 2001, Medicare required that physicians supervise CRNAs in the administration of anesthesia. In 2001, Medicare's rules changed, allowing individual states to decide whether CRNAs may administer anesthesia without physician supervision. In the absence of a state requirement that anesthesiologists supervise CRNAs, individual healthcare facilities decide. CRNA organizations have lobbied in many states for the ability to practice without anesthesiologist supervision; these efforts are opposed by physician groups. In 2011, sixteen states granted CRNAs autonomy, allowing them to practice without anesthesiologist oversight. In 2017, there were 27 states in which CRNAs could independently practice (that is, "without a written collaborative agreement, supervision or conditions for practice"). In 2020, there was no physician supervision requirement for nurse anesthetists in ambulatory surgical facilities in 31 states In states that have opted out of supervision, the Joint Commission and CMS recognize CRNAs as licensed independent practitioners. In states requiring supervision, CRNAs have liability separate from supervising practitioners and are able to administer anesthesia independently of anesthesiologists.

See also
 Anesthesiologist

References 

Anesthesia
Advanced practice registered nursing
Hospital nursing